Clover Creek is a creek in Pierce County, Washington. Clover Creek rises near Frederickson, flows through Spanaway and Parkland, is diverted under the main runway of McChord Air Force Base and Interstate 5, and into Lakewood, where it spills into Lake Steilacoom.

The creek was named for the wild clover growing along its course. Clover Creek was the traditional home of the Sastuck band of the Steilacoom Tribe of Indians.

References

External links
 
 USGS Real-Time Water Data for Clover Creek near Tillicum, WA

Rivers of Washington (state)
Rivers of Pierce County, Washington